Jerome Xavier "Jay" O'Donovan (August 31, 1944 – December 11, 2014) was a former Democratic Party politician from the New York City borough of Staten Island who served in the New York City Council representing the North Shore of that borough. On December 11, 2014, O'Donovan died at his home in the Dongan Hills neighborhood on Staten Island.

Vietnam veteran
O'Donovan was the first Vietnam War veteran elected to the New York City Council. A United States Marine Corps captain and advisor to the South Vietnam Marines, he was awarded two Bronze Stars and the Vietnam Cross of Gallantry with Silver Star.

References

1944 births
Living people
United States Marine Corps personnel of the Vietnam War
New York City Council members
New York (state) Democrats
Recipients of the Silver Star
Recipients of the Gallantry Cross (Vietnam)
United States Marine Corps officers
Jerome
Politicians from Staten Island